The Vysočina Region ("Highlands Region") is an administrative unit of the Czech Republic, located partly in the south-eastern part of the historical region of Bohemia and partly in the south-west of the historical region of Moravia. Its capital is Jihlava.

The region is the location of two mountain ranges, Žďárské vrchy and Jihlavské vrchy, both part of the Bohemian-Moravian Highlands. The Vysočina Region is home to three UNESCO World Heritage Sites, the most in any region in the Czech Republic. The region is one of just three in the country (the others being Prague and the Central Bohemian Region) which does not have a border with a foreign country.

Administrative divisions
The Vysočina Region is divided into 5 districts:

On a lower level, the region has 704 municipalities, second-most in the country behind the Central Bohemian Region.

Population
As of 1 January 2019 the population of the Vysočina Region was 509,274, which was the third lowest out of regions in the Czech Republic. 49.7% of population were men, which was the highest share in the Czech Republic. The density of Vysočina Region is the second lowest in the Czech Republic (75 inhabitants per km2).

The table shows cities and towns in the region with the largest population (as of January 1, 2019):

Culture

With three UNESCO World Heritage Sites, the region is home to more of these than any other region of the Czech Republic. These are the historical centre of Telč, the Pilgrimage Church of Saint John of Nepomuk in Žďár nad Sázavou and the Jewish Quarter and St Procopius' Basilica in Třebíč.

Transport
The Vysočina Region is intersected by the D1 motorway, which passes through Jihlava on the way between Prague and Brno. In 2014 a plan was announced by which a high-speed train, capable of reaching speeds of  would run through the region, involving a total of four stops within the territory. Construction is projected to begin in 2025.

Education
In the Vysočina Region there are two organisations providing further education, namely College of Polytechnics Jihlava and Westmoravian College Třebíč. The College of Polytechnics Jihlava is the only public college in the region, whereas Westmoravian College Třebíč is a private institution, established in 2003.

References

External links
 Official website 

 
Regions of the Czech Republic